Stade Ngalandou Diouf is a multi-use stadium in Rufisque, Senegal.  It is currently used mostly for football matches and serves as a home ground of ASC Yakaar. The stadium holds 7,500 people.

Ngalandou Diouf
Sport in Dakar